Beryl Justice Richmond (August 24, 1907 – April 24, 1980) was a pitcher in Major League Baseball. He played for the Chicago Cubs and Cincinnati Reds during parts of the 1933 and 1934 seasons. Richmond's contract was sold by Baltimore (International) to the Chicago Cubs on January 11, 1933. When Richmond played with the Reds in 1934, he was one of three players (Junie Barnes and Sherman Edwards were the other two) who were not assigned a uniform number. He is buried at Highland Cemetery, in Cameron, West Virginia.

References

External links

1907 births
1980 deaths
Major League Baseball pitchers
Chicago Cubs players
Cincinnati Reds players
Baseball players from West Virginia
People from Marshall County, West Virginia